Parabathippus is a genus of Southeast Asian jumping spiders that was first described by J. X. Zhang & Wayne Paul Maddison in 2012.

Species
 it contains ten species, found in Indonesia, Singapore, Malaysia, and Myanmar:
Parabathippus birmanicus (Thorell, 1895) – Myanmar
Parabathippus cuspidatus Zhang & Maddison, 2012 – Malaysia
Parabathippus digitalis (Zhang, Song & Li, 2003) – Singapore
Parabathippus kiabau Zhang & Maddison, 2012 – Borneo
Parabathippus macilentus (Thorell, 1890) – Indonesia (Sumatra)
Parabathippus magnus Zhang & Maddison, 2012 – Malaysia
Parabathippus petrae (Prószyński & Deeleman-Reinhold, 2012) – Indonesia (Sumatra)
Parabathippus rectus (Zhang, Song & Li, 2003) – Singapore
Parabathippus sedatus (Peckham & Peckham, 1907) – Borneo
Parabathippus shelfordi (Peckham & Peckham, 1907) (type) – Borneo

References

Salticidae genera
Salticidae
Spiders of Asia